This is a  list of rivers of Slovenia. The territory of Slovenia mainly (i.e. 81%) belongs to the Black Sea basin, and a smaller part (i.e. 19%) belongs to the Adriatic Sea basin. These two parts are divided into smaller units in regard to their central rivers, the Mura River basin, the Drava River basin, the Sava River basin with Kolpa River basin, and the basin of the Adriatic rivers.

By drainage basin
This list is arranged by drainage basin, with respective tributaries, arranged in the order of their confluence from mouth to source, indented under each larger stream's name.

Draining into the Mediterranean Sea
Soča River
Nadiža River
Jamjak Creek
Lerada Creek
White Creek (Bela)
Vipava River
Vrtojbica Creek
Lijak Creek
Branica Creek
Mlac Creek
Raša Creek
Košivec Creek
Skrivšek Creek
Jovšček Creek
Hubelj River (sl)
White Creek (Bela)
Idrijca River
Bača River
Knežica Creek
Prošček Creek
Bad Creek (Huda grapa)
Runža Creek
Trebuščica River
Hotenja Creek
Daberšček Creek
Poličanka Creek
Beech Creek (Bukovska grapa)
Cerknica River
Cerenščica Creek
Zaganjalčnica Creek
Otuška Creek
Luknjica Creek
Ugly Creek (Grda grapa)
Kanomljica Creek
Ljubevščica Creek
Gadiča Creek
Tolminka River
Zadlaščica Creek
Hotevlje Creek
Volarja Creek
White Creek (Beli potok)
Kokošnjak Creek
Ročica Creek
Korito Creek
Idrija Creek
Castle Creek (Trnovo ob Soči) (Potok za gradom)
Kozjak Creek
Globoščak Creek
Učja River
Boka Creek
Koritnica River
Prešnik Creek (Prešnikov graben)
Predelica Creek
Kaludrica Creek
Ilovec Creek
Lepenjica Creek
Vrsnik Creek
Laventnik Creek
Reka River
Rižana River (sl)
Dragonja River

Draining into the Black Sea
Sava River
Kolpa River
Lahinja River
Krupa River
Dobličica Creek
Čabranka River
Sotla River
Krka River
Radulja River
Temenica River
Mirna River
Savinja River
Voglajna River
Hudinja River
Ložnica River
Bolska River
Paka River
Dreta River
Rečica Creek
Gračnica Creek (sl)
Ljubnica Creek
Dupljenik Creek
White Creek (Bela)
Klobača Creek
Jurčef Creek
Suhelj Creek
Lašek Creek
Sour Creek (Kisla voda)
Black Creek (Črna)
Jezera Creek
Koritnik Creek (Koritnikov graben)
Boben Creek (sl)
Brnica Creek
Ribnik Creek (sl)
Trboveljščica Creek (sl)
Bevščica Creek (sl)
Šklendrovec Creek (sl)
Medija Creek (sl)
Šumnik Creek (sl)
Pasjek Creek (sl)
Mošenik Creek (sl)
Log Creek (Loški potok)
Sava Creek (Savski potok)
Konj Creek (Konjski potok)
Maljek Creek (sl)
Reka Creek (sl)
Jablanica Creek (Jablaniški potok)
Black Creek (Crni potok)
Rakovnik Creek 
Beden Creek (Bedenov graben)
Horse Creek (Konjski potok)
Deer Creek (Jelenji potok)
Berečan Creek (Berečanov graben)
Drnik Creek (sl)
Prihudnik Creek (sl)
Potok Creek (Potoški graben)
Loki Creek (Loki potok)
Presenec Creek (Presenčev potok) 
Dešen Creek (Dešenski graben) 
Janček Creek (Jančkov graben) 
Lovše Creek (Lovšetov potok)
Cvar Creek (Cvarjev potok)
Zalog Creek (Zaloški potok)
Krmelj Creek (Krmeljev graben)
Jevnica Creek (sl)
Slapnica Creek (sl)
Grabnar Creek (Grabnarjev graben)
Ježe Creek (Ježetov graben)
Mlinščica River (sl) 
Lučna Creek (sl) 
Gostinca Creek
Gobnik Creek
Lutnik Creek (sl) 
Ovčjak Creek (sl) 
Long Creek (Dolgi potok)
Ljubljanica River
Besnica Creek
Aslivka Creek
Šivnik River
Gobovšček River
Hrušica Creek (Hruševski potok)
Mejaš River
Gradaščica River
Glinščica Creek
Pržanec Creek
Šujica Creek
Horjulščica River
Hruševnik Creek
Belca Creek
Šujica Creek
Prosca Creek
Little Creek (Mala voda)
Božna River
Big Božna Creek (Velika Božna)
Little Božna Creek (Mala Božna)
Ižica Creek
Iška Creek
Borovniščica Creek
Bistra Creek
Kamnik Bistrica River
Studenčica Creek
Pšata River
Gobovček Creek
Tunjščica Creek
Reka Creek
Mlinčica Creek
Rača River
Rovščica Creek
Radomlja Creek
Pšata Canal (Kanal Pšata)
Krajčjek Creek
Nevljica River
Oševek Creek
Porebrščica Creek
Stranje Creek (Stranjski potok)
Black Creek (Črna)
Bistričica Creek
Horse Creek (Konjski potok)
Korošica Creek
Sora River
Poljanščica River
Sovpat Creek
Brebovščica Creek
Dršak Creek
Selščica River
Jablenovica Creek
Drbovnik Creek
Selnica Creek
Studeno Creek (Studenska grapa)
Lower Smoleva Creek (Prednja Smoleva)
Plenšak Creek
Upper Smoleva Creek  (Zadnja Smoleva)
Davča Creek
Pruhavca Creek
Pometpoh Creek
Black Creek (Črni potok)
Štajnpoh Creek
Upper Sora Creek (Zadnja Sora)
Kokra River
Tržič Bistrica River
Sava Bohinjka River
Sava Dolinka River
Drava River
Pesnica River
Dravinja River
Oplotniščica River
Polskava River
Fram Creek (Framski potok)
Meža River
Mislinja River
Selčnica Creek
Globoščica Creek
Lakužnica Creek
Mura River
Ledava River
Kerka River (Krka)
Big Krka River (Velika Krka)
Little Krka River (Mala Krka)
Ajaš Creek
Črnec Creek
Kobilje Creek
Ščavnica River

Alphabetically

See also
List of rivers

References

 
Slovenia
Rivers